Austin is a municipality on the western shore of Lake Memphremagog, part of the Memphrémagog Regional County Municipality in the Estrie region of Quebec, Canada.

It was home to inventor Reginald Fessenden. It is named after Nicholas Austin who brought the first settlers, mostly Quakers, to this area from the state of New Hampshire in 1796.

Demographics

Population
Population trend:

Language
Mother tongue (2021)

See also
 List of municipalities in Quebec

References

External links

 Official tourist site for Memphremagog

Municipalities in Quebec
Incorporated places in Estrie